Timofti is a surname. Notable people with the surname include:

 Mihai Timofti (born 1948), Moldovan director, actor, musician, and senior lecturer
 Nicolae Timofti (born 1948), Moldovan politician, president of the Republic of Moldova

See also
Timofte